Disease surveillance is an epidemiological practice by which the spread of disease is monitored in order to establish patterns of progression. The main role of disease surveillance is to predict, observe, and minimize the harm caused by outbreak, epidemic, and pandemic situations, as well as increase knowledge about which factors contribute to such circumstances. A key part of modern disease surveillance is the practice of disease case reporting.

In modern times, reporting incidences of disease outbreaks has been transformed from manual record keeping, to instant worldwide internet communication.

The number of cases could be gathered from hospitals – which would be expected to see most of the occurrences – collated, and eventually made public. With the advent of modern communication technology, this has changed dramatically. Organizations like the World Health Organization (WHO) and the Centers for Disease Control and Prevention (CDC) now can report cases and deaths from significant diseases within days – sometimes within hours – of the occurrence. Further, there is considerable public pressure to make this information available quickly and accurately.

Mandatory reporting
Formal reporting of notifiable infectious diseases is a requirement placed upon health care providers by many regional and national governments, and upon national governments by the World Health Organization to monitor spread as a result of the transmission of infectious agents. Since 1969, WHO has required that all cases of the following diseases be reported to the organization: cholera, plague, yellow fever, smallpox, relapsing fever and typhus. In 2005, the list was extended to include polio and SARS.  Regional and national governments typically monitor a larger set of (around 80 in the U.S.) communicable diseases that can potentially threaten the general population. Tuberculosis, HIV, botulism, hantavirus, anthrax, and rabies are examples of such diseases. The incidence counts of diseases are often used as health indicators to describe the overall health of a population.

World Health Organization
The World Health Organization (WHO) is the lead agency for coordinating global response to major diseases. The WHO maintains Websites for a number of diseases and has active teams in many countries where these diseases occur.

During the SARS outbreak in early 2004, for example, the Beijing staff of the WHO produced updates every few days for the duration of the outbreak. Beginning in January 2004, the WHO has produced similar updates for H5N1. These results are widely reported and closely watched.

WHO's Epidemic and Pandemic Alert and Response (EPR) to detect, verify rapidly and respond appropriately to epidemic-prone and emerging disease threats covers the following diseases:
 Anthrax
 Avian influenza
 Crimean–Congo hemorrhagic fever
 Dengue hemorrhagic fever
 Ebola virus disease
 Hepatitis
 Influenza
 Lassa fever
 Marburg hemorrhagic fever
 Meningococcal disease
 Plague
 Rift Valley fever
 Severe acute respiratory syndrome (SARS)
 Severe acute respiratory syndrome coronavirus 2 (SARS-CoV-2)
 Smallpox
 Tularemia
 Yellow fever

Political challenges
As the lead organization in global public health, the WHO occupies a delicate role in global politics. It must maintain good relationships with each of the many countries in which it is active. As a result, it may only report results within a particular country with the agreement of the country's government. Because some governments regard the release of any information on disease outbreaks as a state secret, this can place the WHO in a difficult position.

The WHO coordinated International Outbreak Alert and Response is designed to ensure "outbreaks of potential international importance are rapidly verified and information is quickly shared within the Network" but not necessarily by the public; integrate and coordinate "activities to support national efforts" rather than challenge national authority within that nation in order to "respect the independence and objectivity of all partners". The commitment that "All Network responses will proceed with full respect for ethical standards, human rights, national and local laws, cultural sensitivities and tradition" ensures each nation that its security, financial, and other interests will be given full weight.

Technical challenges
Testing for a disease can be expensive, and distinguishing between two diseases can be prohibitively difficult in many countries. One standard means of determining if a person has had a particular disease is to test for the presence of antibodies that are particular to this disease. In the case of H5N1, for example, there is a low pathogenic H5N1 strain in wild birds in North America that a human could conceivably have antibodies against. It would be extremely difficult to distinguish between antibodies produced by this strain, and antibodies produced by Asian lineage HPAI A(H5N1). Similar difficulties are common, and make it difficult to determine how widely a disease may have spread.

There is currently little available data on the spread of H5N1 in wild birds in Africa and Asia. Without such data, predicting how the disease might spread in the future is difficult. Information that scientists and decision makers need to make useful medical products and informed decisions for health care, but currently lack include:
 Surveillance of wild bird populations
 Cell cultures of particular strains of diseases

H5N1
Surveillance of H5N1 in humans, poultry, wild birds, cats and other animals remains very weak in many parts of Asia and Africa. Much remains unknown about the exact extent of its spread.

H5N1 in China is less than fully reported. Blogs have described many discrepancies between official China government announcements concerning H5N1 and what people in China see with their own eyes. Many reports of total H5N1 cases have excluded China due to widespread disbelief in China's official numbers. (See Disease surveillance in China.)

"Only half the world's human bird flu cases are being reported to the World Health Organization within two weeks of being detected, a response time that must be improved to avert a pandemic, a senior WHO official said Saturday. Shigeru Omi, WHO's regional director for the Western Pacific, said it is estimated that countries would have only two to three weeks to stamp out, or at least slow, a pandemic flu strain after it began spreading in humans."

David Nabarro, chief avian flu coordinator for the United Nations, says avian flu has too many unanswered questions.

CIDRAP reported on 25 August 2006 on a new US government Website that allows the public to view current information about testing of wild birds for H5N1 avian influenza, which is part of a national wild-bird surveillance plan that "includes five strategies for early detection of highly pathogenic avian influenza. Sample numbers from three of these will be available on HEDDS: live wild birds, subsistence hunter-killed birds, and investigations of sick and dead wild birds. The other two strategies involve domestic bird testing and environmental sampling of water and wild-bird droppings. […] A map on the new USGS site shows that,  birds from Alaska have been tested so far this year, with only a few from most other states. Last year, officials tested just  birds from Alaska and none from most other states, another map shows. The goal of the surveillance program for 2006 is to collect  to  samples from wild birds and  environmental samples, officials have said".

See also
 
 
 
 
 
 
 
 
 
 
 
 
 List of notifiable diseases

References

Further reading
 CDC: Influenza Activity – United States and Worldwide, 2003–2004 Season, and Composition of the 2004–2005 Influenza Vaccine
 Global Outbreak Alert & Response Network
 WHO Alert & Response Operations
 WHO Severe Acute Respiratory Syndrome Web site
 WHO Avian Influenza Web site
 Sickweather The world's first real-time social media disease surveillance tool
 HealthMap The HealthMap real-time automated surveillance system is a program of Children's Hospital Boston with support from Google.org
 GermTrax Tracking the spread of sickness and disease with the help of social media
 ProMED-mail The global electronic reporting system for outbreaks of emerging infectious diseases & toxins, open to all sources. ProMED-mail, the Program for Monitoring Emerging Diseases, is a program of the International Society for Infectious Diseases with the support and encouragement of the Federation of American Scientists and SatelLife.  

Epidemiology
Medical monitoring
Infection-control measures